Burden is a city in Cowley County, Kansas, United States.  As of the 2020 census, the population of the city was 512.

History
In 1879, in anticipation of the coming of the Kansas City, Lawrence and Southern Railroad, the town of Burden was surveyed and laid out by a town company including Robert F. Burden, for whom the town is named. The railroad, whose name changed to the Atchison, Topeka and Santa Fe, arrived on February 1, 1882.

The early buildings included a general store, drug store, and post office. The post office, called Burdenville until 1884, was established in 1879. The first newspaper, printed in 1880, was the Enterprise with a circulation in 1882 of 900. A school which had been located one mile north of the town site was relocated to the town in the summer of 1881.

Burden was a station and shipping point on the Atchison, Topeka and Santa Fe Railway.

Geography
Burden is located at  (37.314128, -96.755377).

Demographics

2010 census
As of the census of 2010, there were 535 people, 195 households, and 145 families living in the city. The racial makeup of the city was 97.2% White, 1.7% Native American, and 1.1% from two or more races. Hispanic or Latino of any race were 3.7% of the population.

There were 195 households, of which 40.0% had children under the age of 18 living with them, 53.3% were married couples living together, 12.8% had a female householder with no husband present, 8.2% had a male householder with no wife present, and 25.6% were non-families. 23.1% of all households were made up of individuals, and 12.8% had someone living alone who was 65 years of age or older. The average household size was 2.74 and the average family size was 3.22.

The median age in the city was 33.2 years. 31.4% of residents were under the age of 18; 7.8% were between the ages of 18 and 24; 24% were from 25 to 44; 21% were from 45 to 64; and 15.5% were 65 years of age or older. The gender makeup of the city was 50.3% male and 49.7% female.

2000 census
As of the census of 2000, there were 564 people, 210 households, and 158 families living in the city. The racial makeup of the city was 93.26% White, 0.18% African American, 2.48% Native American, 1.42% from other races, and 2.66% from two or more races. Hispanic or Latino of any race were 1.95% of the population.

There were 210 households, out of which 37.6% had children under the age of 18 living with them, 56.2% were married couples living together, 11.9% had a female householder with no husband present, and 24.3% were non-families. 21.4% of all households were made up of individuals, and 11.4% had someone living alone who was 65 years of age or older. The average household size was 2.69 and the average family size was 3.12.

In the city, the population was spread out, with 32.6% under the age of 18, 9.2% from 18 to 24, 26.6% from 25 to 44, 16.1% from 45 to 64, and 15.4% who were 65 years of age or older. The median age was 32 years. For every 100 females, there were 97.9 males. For every 100 females age 18 and over, there were 95.9 males.

The median income for a household in the city was $26,641, and the median income for a family was $33,833. Males had a median income of $29,821 versus $17,656 for females. The per capita income for the city was $13,549. About 8.1% of families and 12.2% of the population were below the poverty line, including 14.5% of those under age 18 and 14.4% of those age 65 or over.

Education
The community is served by Central USD 462 public school district.  The Central High School mascot is Central Raiders.

Prior to school unification, the Burden Raiders won the Kansas State High School class B Baseball championship in 1955. Central High School won the 3A State Championship in Football in 1987 and 2A State Championship in the Scholars Bowl in 2011.

References

Further reading

External links
 Burden - Directory of Public Officials
 Burden city map, KDOT

Cities in Kansas
Cities in Cowley County, Kansas